Eisentraut's serotine (Nycticeinops eisentrauti), formerly known as Eisentraut's pipistrelle, is a species of vesper bat in the family Vespertilionidae. It is found in Cameroon, Democratic Republic of the Congo, Kenya, Somalia, and Uganda. Its natural habitats are subtropical or tropical forests.

References

Nycticeinops
Taxonomy articles created by Polbot
Mammals described in 1968
Bats of Africa
Taxobox binomials not recognized by IUCN